Steall Waterfall, also known as An Steall Bàn or Steall Falls, is situated in Glen Nevis near Fort William, Highland, Scotland. The falls can be viewed from the path that runs through the Nevis Gorge, an area owned by the John Muir Trust which manages the area for its wilderness qualities. An Steall Bàn means "The White Spout" in Gaelic

See also 
List of waterfalls
List of waterfalls of the United Kingdom

References

Waterfalls of Highland (council area)
Lochaber